Raleigh National Cemetery is a United States National Cemetery located in the city of Raleigh in Wake County, North Carolina. Administered by the United States Department of Veterans Affairs, it encompasses , and as of the end of 2005, had 6,000 interments. It is currently closed to new interments and is maintained by New Bern National Cemetery.

History 
The cemetery was established in 1865. The cemetery lodge formerly housed the cemetery superintendents / directors.  It was built in 1938, and is a two-story, six-room Colonial Revival frame building with a brick veneer and slate roof.  Other contributing resources are the entrance gate, perimeter wall, rostrum, flagpole, and artillery monument. Raleigh National Cemetery was listed on the National Register of Historic Places in 1997.

Notable monuments 
 The Artillery Monument, a black iron wrought cannon mounted on a cement pedestal, erected circa 1890.

Notable interments 
 Sergeant First Class William Maud Bryant (1933–1969) US Army Special Forces – Medal of Honor recipient for action in the Vietnam War

References

External links 
 National Cemetery Administration
 Raleigh National Cemetery
 
 

National Register of Historic Places in Raleigh, North Carolina
Cemeteries on the National Register of Historic Places in North Carolina
United States national cemeteries
Protected areas of Wake County, North Carolina
Geography of Raleigh, North Carolina
Tourist attractions in Raleigh, North Carolina